Supeshala Jayathilake (born 3 April 1995) is a Sri Lankan cricketer. He made his first-class debut for Sri Lanka Navy Sports Club in the 2012–13 Premier Trophy on 1 March 2013.

References

External links
 

1995 births
Living people
Sri Lankan cricketers
Badureliya Sports Club cricketers
Moors Sports Club cricketers
Panadura Sports Club cricketers
Sri Lanka Navy Sports Club cricketers
Place of birth missing (living people)